The Memorial for Premier Zhou's inspection of the Loukou Yellow River Railway Bridge is a major historical site protect by Shandong Province in Tianqiao District of Jinan, Shandong, China. It commemorates the visit by Premier Zhou Enlai to the Luokou Yellow River Railway Bridge during the 1958 Yellow River flood on August 6, 1958. The bridge was defended against the flood successfully. The site has been listed as a protected by Shandong province since December 23, 1977 (site number 1-03).

See also
List of sites in Jinan
Major historical and cultural sites protected by Shandong Province

References

Zhou Enlai
Tourist attractions in Shandong